Lui Pao Chuen is a military scientist who has played a pivotal role in Singaporean national development.  This includes his roles as: Chairman of the Advisory Board of the Singapore Space and Technology Association (SSTA); Advisor at the Ministry of National Development (MND); Senate Member at the Management Development Institute of Singapore (MDIS); Board of Trustee Member of the Singapore University Technology and Design (SUTD) and Advisor of the National Research Foundation at the Prime Minister's Office.

Radio and Space Research Station 
In 1965 Chuen was appointed scientific officer in the Radio and Space Research Station in Singapore. The following year he was promoted to the Logistics Division to work as Officer-in-Charge of the Test and Evaluation Section.  Ten years after his first appointment he became Special Projects Director.

MINDEF 
Chuen worked at the Ministry of National Development and Defense (MINDEF) for more than four decades.  During this time he played a pivotal role in establishing the groundwork for Singapore's defense capacities within the army.

Awards and recognition 

 1975: SAF Good Service Medal 
 1979: The Public Administration Silver Medal (Silver) 
 1986: Chief Defence Scientist (first time appointee) 
 1992: The Public Administration Gold Medal 
 1997: Long Service Award for three decades service in Singapore
 2002: Distinguished Alumni Award from the US Naval Postgraduate School
 2002: National Science and Technology Medal
 2002: Inducted into Naval Postgraduate School Hall of Fame
 2005: NUS Distinguished Science Alumni Award and Outstanding Service Award
 2007: NUS University Outstanding Service Award
 2008: Elected Honorary Fellow by the Institution of Engineers, Singapore
 2011: IPS President Medal
 2014: Institution of Engineers Singapore's Lifetime Engineering Achievements Award
 2015: Inaugural Defence Technology Medal (Outstanding Service) from the Defence Minister

Education 
Chuen has a BSc (Hons) in Physics from Singapore University, an MA in Operations Research and Systems Analysis.  He was awarded a Postgraduate fellowship from MINDEF and from the Singapore National Academy of Science in 2011.

References 

Singaporean scientists
Year of birth missing (living people)
Living people
Singaporean academics